Ballardini is an Italian surname. Notable people with the surname include:

Davide Ballardini (born 1964), Italian footballer and manager
Elia Ballardini (born 1991), Italian footballer, son of Davide

See also
Ballarini

Italian-language surnames